Ayoob Tarish Absi (born 1942; first name also spelled Ayoub; last name also spelled Absey) is a Yemeni singer and musician from the area of Al-Aboos in the Ta'izz Governorate. Tarish composed "United Republic", the national anthem of Yemen, which was adopted following the Yemenite reunification.

References

External links
List of songs by Tarish
 Lyrics to United Republic

Living people
Yemeni musicians
National anthem writers
1942 births
Yemeni composers
Date of birth missing (living people)
20th-century Yemeni male singers
21st-century Yemeni male singers
Yemeni oud players